The large-eared pied bat (Chalinolobus dwyeri) is a species of vesper bat in the family Vespertilionidae. It can be found in Australia.

See also

Threatened fauna of Australia
List of bats of Australia

References

Bats of Australia
Mammals of Queensland
Mammals of New South Wales
Chalinolobus
Mammals described in 1966
Vulnerable fauna of Australia
Taxonomy articles created by Polbot